The María Clara doctrine, also known as the Woman's Honor doctrine, is a legal doctrine applied by Philippine courts regarding cases that concern abuse against women. The doctrine is a presumption "that women, especially Filipinas, would not admit that they have been abused unless that abuse had actually happened." It was a part of case law in the Philippines for some considerable time but was repudiated by the Supreme Court of the Philippines in 2018.

Etymology
The doctrine was named after María Clara from José Rizal's novel Noli Me Tángere. Clara is characterized as reserved and shy and was later considered an "ideal" role model for women in Filipino culture, although such notion was imposed by Spanish colonizers. This contrasted the ideal of women being more assertive, independent and courageous which dates back to the precolonial era.

Legal history
The doctrine became a part of the Supreme Court of the Philippines' jurisprudence some time in 1960 following the People v. Taño case. The high court through Justice Alejo Labrador asserted a "well known fact" that women, especially Filipinos "would not admit that they have been abused unless that abuse had actually happened." The court said that women's natural instinct is to protect their honor. The case involved three armed robbers who the court found liable for taking turns in raping a woman.

About 58 years later since the doctrine entered the high court's jurisprudence, the Third Division of the Supreme Court reversed a ruling on January 17, 2018 by a Davao court on two people convicted of rape. The 2018 decision was released in late February. The case involved an alleged rape that happened in 2009 and the two accused were sentenced of reclusión perpetua, or forty years of imprisonment, in 2012. The decision was affirmed by the Court of Appeals in 2016.

The court described the doctrine as causing a "travesty of justice" by putting the accused at an "unfair disadvantage", criticizing the doctrine for assuming that no Filipina woman of "decent repute" would falsely claim that she was abused. It urged for the acceptance of the "realities of a woman’s dynamic role" in Philippine society today so one can "evaluate the testimony of a private complainant of rape without gender bias or cultural misconception". It also stated that the discrepancies in the alleged victim's testimonies had cast doubt on whether the rape incident did or did not happen.

This led to concerns and speculations that the high court has abandoned the doctrine. The Gabriela Women's Party condemned the decision which it viewed made the Maria Clara doctrine invalid saying the ruling reversal will empower rapists and disagreed with the court's assessment of the societal status of women.

On February 21, 2018, Supreme Court's spokesperson, Theodore Te has clarified that the doctrine had not been abandoned, explaining that the high court can abandon a doctrine only during a full session.

References

External links
  (PEOPLE OF THE PHILIPPINES, v. JUVY D. AMARELA AND JUNARD G. RACHO, DECISION)

Legal doctrines and principles
Supreme Court of the Philippines cases
Women's rights in the Philippines
Rape in the Philippines